Sidney Herbert Blan (1877-1963) was a politician from Alabama. He served as Secretary of State of Alabama from 1923 to 1927, State Auditor of Alabama from 1927 to 1931, and  Alabama State Treasurer from 1931 to 1935.

Before being elected for public office, Blan served as a Presidential Elector in the 1916 and 1920 Presidential Elections.

He married in 1901 and had two children. He died April 20, 1963.

References

http://www.archives.alabama.gov/conoff/blan.html

Secretaries of State of Alabama
Alabama Democrats
1877 births
1963 deaths
State treasurers of Alabama
State Auditors of Alabama